Pehla Pehla Pyar is a 1994 Indian Hindi-language romantic film directed by Manmohan Singh. It stars Rishi Kapoor and Tabu. The movie is loosely inspired by the American movie Roman Holiday.

Summary

Sapna runs away from her aristocratic home, fed up with the hatred and family politics. She meets with Raj, who she is attracted to. Raj, at first wants to get rid of her, then eventually falls in love with her. Then the two of them have to be on the run as her family finds out where she is after they put up a reward for her whereabouts.

Cast
 Rishi Kapoor as Raj
 Tabu as Sapna
 Anupam Kher as Anand
 Kader Khan as Dharam Pal/Truck driver/grocer/Nawabsaab, Train Passenger/ Street side vendor stall owner.
 Gulshan Grover as Shakti Singh
Amrish Puri as Hukum Singh
Radha Seth as Rani Maa
Tiku Talsania as Anand's Boss
Dinesh Hingoo as Cook at street side vendor
Brahmachari (actor) as Servant at grocery store.
Gopi Bhalla

Soundtrack

The music was scored by Anand–Milind, while the lyrics were authored by veteran lyricist Anand Bakshi. The music was released on CDs and tapes by Venus Records & Tapes c/o Ganesh Jain.

References

External links 
 

1994 films
1990s Hindi-language films
Films scored by Anand–Milind